Monadenia may refer to:
 Monadenia, a genus of snails in the family Monadeniiidae
 Monadenia, a genus of flowering plants in the family Orchidaceae; synonym of Disa